Kampen Church may refer to:

 Kampen Church, Oslo, in Oslo, Norway
 Kampen Church, Stavanger, in Rogaland county, Norway

See also
 Kampen (disambiguation)